Edward Albert Heimberger (April 22, 1906 – May 26, 2005) was an American actor and activist. He was twice nominated for the Academy Award for Best Supporting Actor; the first nomination came in 1954 for his performance in Roman Holiday, and the second in 1973 for The Heartbreak Kid. Other well-known screen roles of his include Bing Edwards in the Brother Rat films, traveling salesman Ali Hakim in the musical Oklahoma!, and the sadistic prison warden in 1974's The Longest Yard. He starred as Oliver Wendell Douglas in the 1960s television sitcom Green Acres and as Frank MacBride in the 1970s crime drama Switch. He also had a recurring role as Carlton Travis on Falcon Crest, opposite Jane Wyman.

Early life
Edward Albert Heimberger was born in Rock Island, Illinois, on April 22, 1906, the eldest of the five children of Frank Daniel Heimberger, a real estate agent, and his wife, Julia Jones. His year of birth is often given as 1908, but this is incorrect. His parents were not married when Albert was born, and his mother altered his birth certificate after her marriage.

When he was one year old, his family moved to Minneapolis, Minnesota. Young Edward secured his first job as a newspaper boy when he was only six. During World War I, his German name led to taunts as "the enemy" by his classmates. He studied at Central High School in Minneapolis and joined the drama club. His schoolmate Harriet Lake (later known as actress Ann Sothern) graduated in the same class. Finishing high school in 1926, he entered the University of Minnesota, where he majored in business.

Career
When he graduated, Albert embarked on a business career. However, the stock market crash in 1929 left him essentially unemployed. He then took odd jobs, working as a trapeze performer, an insurance salesman, and a nightclub singer. Albert stopped using his last name professionally, since it invariably was mispronounced as "Hamburger". He moved to New York City in 1933, where he co-hosted a radio show, The Honeymooners – Grace and Eddie Show, which ran for three years. At the show's end, he was offered a film contract by Warner Bros.

In the 1930s, Albert performed in Broadway stage productions, including Brother Rat, which opened in 1936. He had lead roles in Room Service (1937–1938) and The Boys from Syracuse (1938–1939). In 1936, Albert had also become one of the earliest television actors, performing live in one of RCA's first television broadcasts in association with NBC, a promotion for their New York City radio stations.

Performing regularly on early television, Albert wrote and performed in the first teleplay, The Love Nest, written for television. Done live (not recorded on film), this production took place November 6, 1936, and originated in Studio 3H (now 3K) in the GE Building at Rockefeller Center (then called the RCA Building) in New York City and was broadcast over NBC's experimental television station W2XBS (now WNBC-TV). Hosted by Betty Goodwin, The Love Nest starred Albert, Hildegarde, The Ink Spots, Ed Wynn, and actress Grace Bradt. Before this time, television productions were adaptations of stage plays.

Albert landed the starring role in the 1938 Broadway musical The Boys from Syracuse, and met Burl Ives, who had a small role in the play. The two later briefly shared an apartment in the Beachwood Canyon community of Hollywood after Ives moved west the following year. Also in 1938, Albert made his feature-film debut in the Hollywood version of Brother Rat with Ronald Reagan and Jane Wyman, reprising his Broadway role as cadet "Bing" Edwards. The next year, he starred in On Your Toes, adapted for the screen from the Broadway smash by Rodgers and Hart.

Military
Prior to World War II, and before his film career, Albert had toured Mexico as a clown and high-wire artist with the Escalante Brothers Circus, but secretly worked for U.S. Army intelligence, photographing German U-boats in Mexican harbors. On September 9, 1942, Albert enlisted in the United States Coast Guard and was discharged in 1943 to accept an appointment as a lieutenant in the U.S. Naval Reserve. He was awarded the Bronze Star with Combat "V" for his actions during the invasion of Tarawa in November 1943, when, as the coxswain of a US Navy landing craft, he rescued 47 Marines who were stranded offshore (and supervised the rescue of 30 others), while under heavy enemy machine-gun fire.

As leading man

During the war years, Albert returned to films, starring in ones such as The Great Mr. Nobody, Lady Bodyguard, and Ladies' Day, as well as reuniting with Reagan and Wyman for An Angel from Texas and co-starring with Humphrey Bogart in The Wagons Roll at Night. After the war, he resumed appearing in leading roles, including 1947's Smash-Up, the Story of a Woman, opposite Susan Hayward.

As character actor
From 1948 on, Albert guest-starred in nearly 90 television series. He made his guest-starring debut on an episode of The Ford Theatre Hour. This part led to other roles such as Chevrolet Tele-Theatre, Suspense, Lights Out, Schlitz Playhouse of Stars, Studio One, Philco Television Playhouse, Your Show of Shows, Front Row Center, The Alcoa Hour, and in dramatic series The Eleventh Hour, The Reporter, and General Electric Theater.

In 1959, Albert was cast as businessman Dan Simpson in the episode "The Unwilling" of the NBC Western series Riverboat. In the story line, Dan Simpson attempts to open a general store in the American West despite a raid from pirates on the Mississippi River, who stole from him $20,000 in merchandise. Debra Paget is cast in this episode as Lela Russell; Russell Johnson is Darius, and John M. Picard is uncredited as a river pirate.

On stage
The 1950s also had a return to Broadway for Albert, including roles in Miss Liberty (1949–1950) and The Seven Year Itch (1952–1955). In 1960, Albert replaced Robert Preston in the lead role of Professor Harold Hill, in the Broadway production of The Music Man. Albert also performed in regional theater. He created the title role of Marc Blitzstein's Reuben, Reuben in 1955 in Boston. He performed at The Muny Theater in St. Louis, reprising the Harold Hill role in The Music Man in 1966 and playing Alfred P. Doolittle in My Fair Lady in 1968.

1950s and 1960s film career

In the 1950s, Albert appeared in film roles such as that of Lucille Ball's fiancé in The Fuller Brush Girl (1950), Bill Gorton in The Sun Also Rises (1957), and a traveling salesman in Carrie (1952). He was nominated for his first Oscar as Best Supporting Actor with Roman Holiday (1953). In Oklahoma! (1955), he played a womanizing Persian peddler, and in Who's Got the Action? (1962), he portrayed a lawyer helping his partner (Dean Martin) cope with a gambling addiction. In Teahouse of the August Moon (1956), he played a psychiatrist with an enthusiasm for farming. He appeared in several military roles, including The Longest Day (1962), about the Normandy invasion. The film Attack (1956) provided Albert with a dark role as a cowardly, psychotic Army captain whose behavior threatens the safety of his company. In a similar vein, he played a psychotic United States Army Air Force colonel in Captain Newman, M.D. (1963), opposite Gregory Peck.

Television series
He guest-starred on various series, including ABC's The Pat Boone Chevy Showroom, and the Westinghouse Studio One series (CBS, 1953–54), playing Winston Smith in the first TV adaptation of 1984, by William Templeton.

Leave It to Larry
In his first TV series, Albert portrayed Larry Tucker on the situation comedy Leave It to Larry, which ran from October 14, 1952, until December 23, 1952, on CBS. Tucker was a married man who encountered his father-in-law at work and at home.

The Eddie Albert Show
Albert had his own daytime variety program, The Eddie Albert Show, on CBS television in 1953. Singer Ellen Hanley was a regular on the show. A review in Broadcasting magazine panned the program, saying, "Mr. Albert, with the help of Miss Hanley, conducts an interview, talks a little, sings a little, and looks all-thumbs a lot."

Saturday Night Revue
Beginning June 12, 1954, Albert was host of Saturday Night Revue, which replaced Your Show of Shows on NBC. The 9:00–10:30 pm (Eastern Time) program also featured Ben Blue and Alan Young and the Sauter-Finegan Orchestra.

Guest appearances
In 1962, Albert appeared as Cal Kroeger on the TV Western The Virginian in the episode titled "Impasse". In 1964, Albert guest-starred in "Cry of Silence", an episode of the science-fiction television series The Outer Limits. Albert played Andy Thorne, who along with his wife Karen (played by June Havoc), had decided to leave the city and buy a farm (a recurring theme in Albert's career). They find themselves lost and in the middle of a deserted valley, where they come under attack by a series of tumbleweeds, frogs, and rocks. Also in 1964, he guest-starred as a government agent in the pilot episode of Voyage to the Bottom of the Sea entitled "Eleven Days to Zero". Albert appeared as Taylor Dickson, a western photographer in season seven, episode 11 as “The Photographer” in Rawhide, alongside Clint Eastwood (Rowdy Yates) aired December 11, 1964.

Albert was cast as Charlie O'Rourke in the 1964 episode "Visions of Sugar Plums" of the NBC education drama series, Mr. Novak, starring James Franciscus. Bobby Diamond, formerly of the Fury series, also appeared in this episode.

Green Acres

In 1965, Albert was approached by producer Paul Henning to star in a new sitcom for CBS called Green Acres. His character, Oliver Wendell Douglas, was a lawyer who left the city to enjoy a simple life as a gentleman farmer. Co-starring on the show was Eva Gabor as his urbanite, spoiled wife, Lisa. The show was an immediate hit, achieving fifth place in the ratings in its first season. The series lasted six seasons with 170 episodes.

In 1968, Albert was a guest on The Carol Burnett Show episode six. He played Harvey Korman's boss in an episode of "Carol and Sis", and sang.

Switch
After a four-year-absence from the small screen, and upon reaching age 69 in 1975, Albert signed a new contract with Universal Television, and starred in the popular 1970s adventure/crime drama Switch for CBS, as a retired police officer, Frank McBride, who goes to work as a private detective with a former criminal he had once jailed. In its first season, Switch was a hit. By late 1976, the show had become a more serious and traditional crime drama. At the end of its third season in 1978, ratings began to drop, and the show was cancelled after 70 episodes.

Television specials
Eddie Albert appeared in a number of television specials. His first was the 1956 made-for-television NBC documentary Our Mr. Sun, a Bell Telephone-produced color special. Directed by Frank Capra, it blends live action and animation. Albert appears with Dr. Frank Baxter, who appears in several other Bell Telephone science specials.

In 1965, the year that Green Acres premiered, Albert served as host/narrator for the telecast of a German-American made-for-television film version of The Nutcracker, which was rerun several times. The host sequences and the narration were especially filmed for English-language telecasts of this short film (it was only an hour in length, and cut much from the Tchaikovsky ballet).

In 1968, he voiced Myles Standish in the Rankin/Bass animated TV special The Mouse on the Mayflower.

Later work
In 1971, Albert guest-starred in a season-one Columbo episode called "Dead Weight", which also featured guest star Suzanne Pleshette, as a highly decorated retired US Marine Corps major general, and combat war hero from the Korean War, who murders his adjutant to cover up an illegal quid pro quo contracting conspiracy scheme.

In 1972, Albert resumed his film career and was nominated for an Oscar for Best Supporting Actor for his performance as an overprotective father in The Heartbreak Kid (1972), and delivered a memorable performance opposite Burt Reynolds as an evil prison warden in 1974's The Longest Yard. In a lighter vein, Albert portrayed the gruff though soft-hearted Jason O'Day in the successful Disney film Escape to Witch Mountain in 1975.

Albert appeared in such 1980s films as How to Beat the High Cost of Living (1980), Yesterday (1981), Take This Job and Shove It (1981), Rooster (1982 television film), and Yes, Giorgio (1982), and as the US President in Dreamscape (1984). His final feature film role was a cameo appearance in The Big Picture (1989). He also appeared in many all-star television miniseries, including Evening in Byzantium (1978), The Word (1978), Peter and Paul (1981), Goliath Awaits (1981), and War and Remembrance (1988).

In 1982, Albert sang the character role of the elderly Altoum in the San Francisco Opera staging of Puccini's Turandot.

In the mid-1980s, Albert was reunited with longtime friend and co-star of the Brother Rat and An Angel from Texas films, Jane Wyman, in a recurring role as the villainous Carlton Travis in the popular 1980s soap opera Falcon Crest. He also guest-starred on an episode of the 1980s television series Highway to Heaven, as well as Murder, She Wrote, and in 1990, he reunited with Eva Gabor for a Return to Green Acres. In 1993, he guest-starred for several episodes on the ABC daytime soap opera General Hospital as Jack Boland, and also made a guest appearance on the Golden Girls spin-off The Golden Palace the same year.

Hollywood blacklist
Eddie Albert's wife, Mexican actress Margo, was well known in Hollywood for her left-wing political leanings, but she was not a member of the Communist Party. In 1950, Margo and Albert's names were both published in "Red Channels", an anti-Communist pamphlet that sought to expose purported Communist influence within the entertainment industry. This was part of a larger trend of blacklisting motion-picture professionals whose known or suspected Communist leanings, unless they testified before the House Un-American Activities Committee to disavow any Communist affiliations.

Albert's son spoke of his parents' blacklisting in an interview published in December 1972, crediting Albert's military service during World War II with ultimately saving his career:

Albert later spoke of this period: "Everyone was so full of fear. Many people couldn't support their families, or worse, their lives were ruined and they had to go out and do menial jobs. Some even killed themselves." While Albert's career survived the blacklist, his wife, Margo, had extreme difficulty finding work.

Activism and interests
Albert was active in social and environmental causes, especially from the 1970s onward. 
In 1970, Albert participated in the creation of Earth Day and spoke at one of its events in that year.

Albert founded the Eddie Albert World Trees Foundation and was national chairman for the Boy Scouts of America's conservation program. He was a trustee of the National Recreation and Park Association and a member of the U.S. Department of Energy's advisory board. TV Guide called him "an ecological Paul Revere".

He was special envoy for Meals for Millions and consultant for the World Hunger Conference. He joined Albert Schweitzer in a documentary about African malnutrition.<ref>Excerpts of documentary about African malnutrition at Google Video</ref> and fought agricultural and industrial pollution, particularly DDT. Albert promoted organic gardening, and founded City Children's Farms for inner-city children, while supporting eco-farming and tree planting.
Albert was also a director of the U.S. Council on Refugees.

Beginning in the 1940s, Eddie Albert Productions produced films for various US corporations, as well as documentaries such as Human Beginnings (a for-its-time controversial sex-education film) and Human Growth.

In 1971 he starred in an industrial film sponsored and promoted by a major logging and forest products concern called Weyerhaeuser Company. which emphasized the Pacific Northwest. Shot partly amid old growth timber and narrated soley by Albert, the film documented industrial methods of handling such trees for market. It also shows re-planted clear cuts and emphasized "the need for advanced lumber production in response to rapidly increasing population," according to the Texas Archive of the Moving Image.

Personal life
Albert married Mexican actress Margo (née María Margarita Guadalupe Teresa Estela Bolado Castilla y O'Donnell) in 1945. Albert and Margo had a son, Edward Jr., also an actor, and adopted a daughter, Maria, who became her father's business manager. Margo Albert died from brain cancer on July 17, 1985.

The Alberts lived in Pacific Palisades, California, in a Spanish-style house on an acre of land  with a cornfield in front. Albert grew organic vegetables in a greenhouse and recalled how his parents had a "liberty garden" at home during World War I.

Final years and death

Albert was diagnosed with Alzheimer's disease in 1995. His son put aside his acting career to care for his father. Despite his illness, Albert exercised regularly until shortly before his death. Eddie Albert died of pneumonia on May 26, 2005, at the age of 99 in his home in Pacific Palisades, California. He was interred at Westwood Village Memorial Park Cemetery, next to his late wife and near his Green Acres co-star Eva Gabor. 

Albert's son, Edward, Jr. (1951–2006), was an actor, musician, singer, and linguist/dialectician. Edward Jr. died at age 55, one year after his father. He had been suffering from lung cancer for 18 months.

For contributions to the television industry, Eddie Albert was honored with a star on the Hollywood Walk of Fame at 6441 Hollywood Boulevard.

Filmography

References

Further reading
 Wise, James. Stars in Blue: Movie Actors in America's Sea Services. Annapolis, MD: Naval Institute Press, 1997.  

External links

 
 
 
 
 
 A 1996 Interview
 Obituary in the Los Angeles Daily News''

1906 births
2005 deaths
20th-century American male actors
American male film actors
People from Rock Island, Illinois
Male actors from Los Angeles
Male actors from Minnesota
American people of German descent
American gardeners
United States Navy personnel of World War II
American male musical theatre actors
American male radio actors
American male soap opera actors
American male stage actors
American male television actors
American male voice actors
Television personalities from Los Angeles
American beekeepers
Bell Records artists
Burials at Westwood Village Memorial Park Cemetery
Deaths from Alzheimer's disease
Deaths from pneumonia in California
Deaths from dementia in California
Male actors from Minneapolis
Military personnel from Illinois
People from Pacific Palisades, California
United States Navy officers
Carlson School of Management alumni
Warner Bros. contract players
Activists from California
20th-century American singers
20th-century American male singers
United States Coast Guard personnel of World War II
Central High School (Minneapolis, Minnesota) alumni
United States Coast Guard enlisted
United States Navy reservists